Charles Willis Lane (January 25, 1869–October 17, 1945) was an American stage and film actor, active from 1914 to 1929. Like many film performers born before 1900 Lane had extensive prior Broadway stage or regional theatrical experience stretching back to his youth in the 1890s.

Lane was born in Madison, Illinois, and can be seen in silent films usually as a silver-haired other man or confidant. Two of his best-known roles are Dr. Lanyon in Dr. Jekyll and Mr. Hyde (1920) and Dr. Angus McPhail in Sadie Thompson (1928).

Partial filmography

 The Man from Mexico (1914) (* unconfirmed and/or uncredited) 
 Mrs. Black Is Back (1914, also in 1904 Broadway play) - Prof. Newton Black
 Ruggles of Red Gap (1918) - Earl of Brinstead
 Wanted: A Husband (1919) - Tom Harmon
 Dr. Jekyll and Mr. Hyde (1920) - Dr. Richard Lanyon
 Away Goes Prudence (1920) - Mr. Thorne
 Guilty of Love (1920) - Goddard Townsend
 The Branded Woman (1920) - Herbert Averill
 The Restless Sex (1920) - John Cleland
 Without Limit (1921) - Clement Palter
 If Women Only Knew (1921) - Dr. John Strong
 Love's Penalty (1921) - Rev. John Kirchway
 Fascination (1922) - Eduardo de Lisa (her father)
 Broadway Rose (1922) - Peter Thompson
 How Women Love (1922) - Ogden Ward
 The Tents of Allah (1923) - Commander Millgrate
 The White Sister (1923) - Prince Chiaromonte
 Second Youth (1924) - Weeks Twombly
 Romola (1924) - Baldassar Calvo
 I Want My Man (1925) - French Doctor
 The Marriage Whirl (1925) - Reuben Hale
 The Dark Angel (1925) - Sir Hubert Vane
 Stella Dallas (1925) - Stephen Dallas, Sr. (uncredited)
 Pearl of Love (1925) - Captain Pinnel
 The Outsider (1926) - Sir Jasper Sturdee
 The Blind Goddess (1926) - Judge
 Padlocked (1926) - Monte Hermann
 The Mystery Club (1926) - John Cranahan
 Marriage License? (1926) - Sir John
 The Winning of Barbara Worth (1926) - Jefferson Worth
 The Music Master (1927) - Richard Stanton
 The Whirlwind of Youth (1927) - Jim Hawthorne
 Married Alive (1927) - Mr. Fountain
 Service for Ladies (1927) - Robert Foster, her father
 Barbed Wire (1927) - Col. Duval
 Sadie Thompson (1928) - Dr. Angus McPhail
 The Canary Murder Case (1929) - Charles Spottswoode
 Saturday's Children (1929) - Mr. Henry Halevy
 Broadway Scandals (1929) - Radio Announcer (final film role)

External links

Lantern slide featuring Charles Willis Lane and Anna Q. Nilsson from the film Without Limit (1921) (Wayback Machine)

1869 births
1945 deaths
American male film actors
American male silent film actors
American male stage actors
Male actors from Illinois
20th-century American male actors